Vladimir Guchsha (born May 18, 1967, in Pavlodar, Kazakh SSR, Soviet Union) is a Kazakhstani sport shooter. He competed at the 2000 Summer Olympics in the men's 50 metre pistol event, in which he placed eighth, and the men's 10 metre air pistol event, in which he tied for 23rd place.

References

1967 births
Living people
ISSF pistol shooters
Kazakhstani male sport shooters
Shooters at the 2000 Summer Olympics
Olympic shooters of Kazakhstan
People from Pavlodar
Asian Games medalists in shooting
Asian Games gold medalists for Kazakhstan
Asian Games silver medalists for Kazakhstan
Asian Games bronze medalists for Kazakhstan
Shooters at the 1998 Asian Games
Shooters at the 2002 Asian Games
Medalists at the 1998 Asian Games
Medalists at the 2002 Asian Games
21st-century Kazakhstani people
20th-century Kazakhstani people